Jens Weißflog (born 21 July 1964) is a German former ski jumper. He is one of the best and most successful ski jumpers in the history of the sport. Only Finns Matti Nykänen and Janne Ahonen, Poles Adam Małysz and Kamil Stoch and Austrian Gregor Schlierenzauer have won more World Cup victories.

Career
Weißflog was born in Erlabrunn (now a part of Breitenbrunn, Saxony) in the Erzgebirge range.

As a 19-year-old he won the Four Hills Tournament for East Germany in 1983/84. Weißflog was known as "Floh" (flea in German) due to his slight stature and his light body. That same winter he won the combined World Cup and later the normal hill event at the 1984 Winter Olympics in Sarajevo. The following winter was dominated by Weißflog and the outstanding Finn Matti Nykänen.

The most remarkable part of his career is that he competed at the top level for twelve years.  Neither the regime change from East Germany to the unified Germany in late 1990, nor the change in ski jumping techniques from the parallel technique to the V-style around 1993 stopped his success. In 1994 he won two gold medals in the individual large hill and team large hill events at the 1994 Winter Olympics in Lillehammer, ten years after his first Olympic victory. He finished his career in 1996 by becoming the first ski jumper to win the combined Four Hills Tournament four times. Only the Finn Janne Ahonen has surpassed that record by winning the Four Hills Tournament five times. He had also earned five-second-place finishes in the competition over the course of his career. After this achievement he retired from professional sport.

At the FIS Nordic World Ski Championships, Weißflog won two golds in the individual normal hill (1985, 1989), three silvers in the individual large hill (1989) and team large hill (1984 and 1995), and four bronzes in the individual large hill (1991, 1993) and team large hill (1985 and 1991). He also won two medals at the FIS Ski Flying World Championships with a silver in 1985 and a bronze in 1990.

Weißflog also won the ski jumping competition at the Holmenkollen ski festival twice (1989, 1990). He was awarded the Holmenkollen medal in 1991 (shared with Vegard Ulvang, Trond Einar Elden, and Ernst Vettori).

Today, Jens Weißflog owns a hotel in his home town of Oberwiesenthal and is the main ski jump commentator for German television station ZDF.

World Cup

Standings

Wins

References
 
 Holmenkollen medalists – click Holmenkollmedaljen for downloadable pdf file 
 Holmenkollen winners since 1892 – click Vinnere for downloadable pdf file 
 Official website 
 SVZ (German TV) Profile 

 

1964 births
Living people
People from Erzgebirgskreis
Sportspeople from Saxony
German male ski jumpers
Holmenkollen medalists
Holmenkollen Ski Festival winners
Olympic ski jumpers of East Germany
Olympic ski jumpers of Germany
Olympic gold medalists for East Germany
Olympic gold medalists for Germany
Ski jumpers at the 1984 Winter Olympics
Ski jumpers at the 1988 Winter Olympics
Ski jumpers at the 1992 Winter Olympics
Ski jumpers at the 1994 Winter Olympics
Olympic medalists in ski jumping
FIS Nordic World Ski Championships medalists in ski jumping
Medalists at the 1984 Winter Olympics
Medalists at the 1994 Winter Olympics
Recipients of the Patriotic Order of Merit in gold
Recipients of the Cross of the Order of Merit of the Federal Republic of Germany
Recipients of the Silver Laurel Leaf